The superior thyroid vein begins in the substance and on the surface of the thyroid gland, by tributaries corresponding with the branches of the superior thyroid artery, and ends in the upper part of the internal jugular vein.

It receives the superior laryngeal and cricothyroid veins.

Additional images

References

Veins of the head and neck
Thyroid